Robbin Söderlund, better known by his artistic name Raaban (born 30 April 1987 in Borås, Sweden), is a Swedish DJ and music producer. He was also part of the production duo Tungevaag & Raaban alongside Norwegian DJ/producer Martin Tungevaag until they split in late 2019.

Career
Raaban started his career in Sweden as producer and DJ of Laser Inc, a two-person Swedish Eurodance band made up of singer-songwriter Jonas on vocals and Robbin Söderlund as DJ and producer. For some time the band also included Izko (Chainkickerz). The band's single "Det var en gång en fågel" became a hit in Sweden and Finland in the summer of 2007, reaching number six on the Swedish charts with a 15-week run. It also reached number 11 on the Finnish charts. Based on the chart success, Laser Inc released the 12-track album Roger That! on May 4, 2009 under the Warner Music Sweden Label.

After Laser Inc, Robbin Söderlund has continued to produce tracks for a wide range of purposes, including music for international recognized brands, various productions of Swedish Idol television show and a great number of artists like Swedish singer of Lebanese origin Rabih Jaber in a club version of "Grenade", "Millionaire" and "Don't Wanna Wake Up", the Universal Music Japan signed singer Yuka Masaki as well as the Swedish house duo Stockholm Syndrome singles "Pretty Girl" and "Karma". He has also produced a lot of remixes, an own EP named One of a Kind released on Disco:Wax 2011 containing collaborations with Alex and Rabih Jaber. He has produced under alias names such as 'Brilliant' and 'Dunk Dunk'.

In 2015 he became part of the DJ/music production duo Tungevaag & Raaban. Tungevaag & Raaban is today signed by Sony Music and "Samsara" was their first single as a duo.

Discography

Albums
as part of Laser Inc
2009: Roger That!

EPs
as Raaban
2011: One of a Kind (EP)

Singles
as Laser Inc
2007: "Det var en gång en fågel"

As Tungevaag & Raaban
(For detailed listing, refer to Refer to discography on Tungevaag & Raaban)
2015: "Samsara" (featuring Emila)	
2015: "Parade"
2015: "Russian Roulette" (with Charlie Who?)
2016: "Wolf"
2016: "Magical"
2016: "Stay Awake" (feat. VENIOR)	
2017: "Wake Up Alone" (feat. Clara Mae)
2017: "Cold Blood" (feat. Jeffrey James)
2017: "Coming Up" (feat. Victor Crone)
2017: "Beside Me" (with Tom Swoon)
2018: "All For Love" 
2019: "Take Me Away" (feat. Victor Crone)

Others
2010: Raaban and Evana – "Realize" (Single and Remixes)
2011: Raaban feat. Rabih – "Grenade"
2021: MOTi X Raaban - "One Day"
Productions
2011: Rabih Jaber – "Millionaire" (Produced by Raaban)
2011: Yuka Masaki – "Lady Luck"
2012: Stockholm Syndrome – "Pretty Girl"
2013: Stockholm Syndrome – "Karma"

References

Swedish DJs
Swedish record producers
Living people
1987 births
Electronic dance music DJs